The yellow-headed temple turtle (Heosemys annandalii) is a large species of turtle in the family Geoemydidae. The species is native to Southeast Asia.

Etymology
The common name, "yellow-headed temple turtle", is derived from the fact that it is often found near Buddhist temples within its range.

The specific name, annandalii, is in honor of Scottish herpetologist Nelson Annandale.

Description
H. annandalii may grow to over 20 in (51 cm) in straight carapace length.

Behavior
H. annandalii is aquatic, and is generally herbivorous.

Conservation status
The Convention on International Trade in Endangered Species of Wild Fauna and Flora (CITES) suspended trade of yellow-headed temple turtles in July 2012.

Geographic range
H. annandalii is found in Cambodia, Laos, Malaysia, Thailand, Vietnam, and possibly Myanmar.

Habitat
The preferred natural habitats of H. annandalii are wet forests and freshwater wetlands.

Captivity
H. annandalii may live in captivity for up to 35 years.

Two turtles were hatched in November 2019 at the Columbus Zoo and Aquarium. Heosemys annadali has been breed in captivity.

Parasites

The leech Placobdelloides siamensis is an ectoparasite of this turtle.

References

External link

Bibliography

Further reading
Boulenger GA (1903). "Report on the Batrachians and Reptiles". pp. 131–178. In: Annandale N, Robinson HC (1903). Fasciculi Malayenses: Anthropological and Zoological Results of an Expedition to Perak and the Siamese Malay States, 1901-1902. Zoology, Part I. London, New York and Bombay: Longmans, Green & Co. for The University Press of Liverpool. 189 pp. (Cyclemys annandalii, new species, pp. 142–144 + Plates VII-VIII).
Chan-ard, Tanya; Parr, John W.K.; Nabhitabhata, Jarujin (2015). A Field Guide to the Reptiles of Thailand. New York: Oxford University Press. 314 pp.  (hardcover),  (paperback).
Smith MA (1931). The Fauna of British India, Including Ceylon and Burma. Reptilia and Amphibia. Vol. I.—Loricata, Testudines. London: Secretary of State for India in Council. (Taylor and Francis, printers). xxviii + 185 pp. + Plates I-II. ("Hieremys annandalei [sic]", pp. 107–109, Figures 24-25).

Heosemys
Reptiles described in 1903
Turtles of Asia